The Bulgarian International Championship is an international badminton tournament  held in Bulgaria since 2012. This tournament also known as Bulgarian Hebar Open or Bulgarian Eurasia Open. The 2014 tournament used the best of five games 11 points scoring system. Another badminton tournament in Bulgaria with the higher level known as Bulgarian Open.

Previous winners

Performances by countries

References

External links 
BWF Calendar
Badminton-squash club Pazardjik
Българска Федерация по Бадминтон

Badminton tournaments in Bulgaria
2012 establishments in Bulgaria
Recurring sporting events established in 2012